Mir Zia Langau is a Pakistani politician who is the current Provincial Minister of the Balochistan for Forest and Wildlife, in office since 30 August 2018. He has been a member of Provincial Assembly of the Balochistan since August 2018.

Early life 
He was born on 15 October 1981.

Political career
He was elected to the Provincial Assembly of the Balochistan as a candidate of Balochistan Awami Party (BAP) from Constituency PB-37 (Kalat) in 2018 Pakistani general election.

On 27 August 2018, he was inducted into the provincial Balochistan cabinet of Chief Minister of Jam Kamal Khan. On 30 August, he was appointed as Provincial Minister of Balochistan for forest and wildlife.

References

Living people
Politicians from Balochistan, Pakistan
Balochistan Awami Party MPAs (Balochistan)
1981 births